The Bristol Port Railway and Pier (occasionally referred to as the Bristol Port and Pier Railway) was a railway in Bristol, England.

Route

Upon leaving Hotwells, the line ran north alongside the River Avon through two tunnels, to a halt and passing point, then to Sneyd Park Junction, where the Clifton Extension Railway joined it. The main BPRP line continued on into its Avonmouth terminus.

History

Formation
Bristol sits on the River Avon, with its docks several miles inland. By the 19th century, ships had grown to such a size that navigating the Avon was not possible any more, and they had to dock at the head of the river at Avonmouth instead. The railway's act of parliament was passed on 17 July 1862, with Benjamin Burleigh appointed as engineer. It was the first standard gauge line in Bristol. The railway opened on 6 March 1865, although this was not announced in advance so that the line would not be overwhelmed by more people than the single locomotive could haul, and timetables were posted at Hotwells only minutes before the first departure.

Connection to the network
As built, the railway was isolated from the rest of the national network, having not been intended for anything more than local traffic. However, with very little goods traffic, a connection to the main line railways was needed to develop Avonmouth as a port. An extension from Hotwells to the city's main station at Temple Meads would have required crossing a large amount of developed land, and so was prohibitively expensive. Instead, a link was proposed from the BPRP at Sneyd Park, running under Clifton Down to join the Midland Railway and Bristol and South Wales Union Railway.

The connection was authorised in 1867, but the BPRP was in financial difficulties and unable to attract investors. Instead, the company joined forces with the Midland and Great Western Railways to build the Clifton Extension Railway, which opened in 1877 for freight to the newly built Avonmouth Docks. The double-track CER was not initially open to passengers, as although the Sneyd Park –  section was certified for passenger use in 1878, the MR and GWR did not believe the BPRP line was in a suitable state to carry their passengers. The MR obtained parliamentary powers to install block signalling on the line at the BPRP's expense, and through trains eventually started on 1 September 1885.

Buyout and legacy

On 25 July 1890, Parliament approved a bill allowing the Midland and Great Western to buy out the BPRP, the BPRP effectively merging with the Clifton Extension Railway from 1 September that year.

Increased traffic led to the line being doubled from Avonmouth to Shirehampton in 1903, and to Sneyd Park in 1907. The Avonmouth terminus closed to passengers in 1902 to allow construction of the Royal Edward Dock, although workers' trains continued into 1903. Traffic on the Hotwells branch peaked in 1910 at ten trains per day and six on Sundays, and in 1917  was built to handle the large number of wartime munitions workers travelling to Avonmouth. The branch was closed in 1922 to make way for construction of the A4 Portway. The line from Sneyd Park Junction to Dock Junction and the stations of Shirehampton and Sea Mills survive as part of the Severn Beach Line.

Portnalls Number One Railway Tunnel, just north of Hotwells station, was used during the Second World War as an air-raid shelter by the people of Bristol. It became so popular that the City Council had to institute a pass system. The tunnel was once again used in the late twentieth century by the Bristol Gun Club, who converted a portion of it into a firing range. However, this ended following the passage of the Firearms (Amendment) (No. 2) Act 1997 which banned handguns in the United Kingdom, and the tunnel was once more abandoned. It is currently split in three parts – the firing range, a section of original tunnel, and the shelter.

In the 2000s subsidence and movement in the Number Two tunnel affected the road above, Bridge Valley Road, which required major stabilization work and the waterproof tanking of the tunnel, to enable the road to be reopened.

Services
Initial service from March 1865 was six trains per day in each direction, with four down (Hotwells to Avonmouth) and five up (Avonmouth to Hotwells) on Sundays, taking around 30 minutes for the  trip. On weekdays the quickest was 26 minutes, and 20 minutes on Sundays as Shirehampton was closed due to objections from the local church, although this concession was reversed by May that year. The fare for a single between Hotwells and Avonmouth was 1s 0d, 9d and 6d for first, second and third class respectively, with returns 6d more.

By January 1866 the service was reduced to three down and four up per day, with one Shirehampton-Avonmouth except on Sundays; this increased to five up and down in April that year, with one Hotwells-Shirehampton except on Sundays. By June the service was five up and down on Sundays, and six on other days. Two extra trains per day were laid on when  was opened, and by summer 1887 there were ten up and down, with four each way and an Avonmouth-Shirehampton return on Sundays.

By 1910 Avonmouth was no longer a resort, but instead a workplace, and so Sunday service was reduced to two trains each way, taking 19 minutes each. The Sunday service had been completely discontinued by 1920, with weekday service reduced to nine down and eight up, with journey times of 18 minutes, and the first two morning departures forsaking the Hotwells terminus for Hotwells Halt's longer platform. From September 1921, the Halt was the terminus of the BPRP line, as the Hotwells terminus was closed to allow construction of the A4 Portway. Hotwells Halt, and the line to Sneyd Park Junction, closed on 3 July 1922, with the final train running on 1 July.

According to some sources, the trains were not operated by the BPRP itself, but instead were operated under a lease agreement by the Bristol and Exeter Railway. This lease was taken over by the Great Western Railway in 1871, along with the rest of the Bristol and Exeter.

Rolling stock
The BPRP had two 0-4-2 side tank locomotives, possibly from the St Helens Railway. Coaching stock was four-wheeled; there were initially 14 carriages, rising to around 20 according to some reports, all of which were disposed of when the line was taken over. The BPRP also possessed two covered and two uncovered wagons, in a light grey livery. The coaching stock was painted yellow and white, with some later painted dark chocolate.

See also
Rail transport in Bristol

References

External links

 
Rail transport in Bristol
Transport in South Gloucestershire District
Railway lines opened in 1865
Closed railway lines in South West England
Standard gauge railways in England
Railway lines closed in 1922